Rosa Carvalho (born 1952) is a Portuguese artist.

Early life and education
Rosa Carvalho was born in Lisbon in 1952. She studied fine arts at the University of Lisbon.

Artistic work
Carvalho is particularly known for painstakingly reproducing works by painters such as François Boucher, Francisco de Goya, Rembrandt, Jacques-Louis David and Diego Velasquez, in which she removes the, often naked, female figures present in the original paintings, thus highlighting the under-representation of women in art or their excessive presence in history as a muse and not a creator. Examples of paintings that she has treated in this way include Portrait of Madame Récamier by David and The Blonde Odalisque by Boucher.

Exhibitions
Carvalho first exhibited in exhibitions of modern art in Lagos, Portugal and in Porto in 1982. Her first solo exhibition was in 1985 in Lisbon. Mainly exhibiting in Portugal, she has also had two solo exhibitions in Belgium. In collective exhibitions her work has been shown in Brazil, Germany, Mozambique and Spain. Most recently, her work was exhibited in 2021 as part of an exhibition of Portuguese female artists at the Calouste Gulbenkian Museum, entitled Tudo o que eu quero (All that I want), which was part of the cultural programme of the Portuguese Presidency of the Council of the European Union.

Collections
The work of Carvalho is held by a large number of collections, including those of the Portuguese Ministry of Foreign Affairs and Secretary of State for Culture, Energias de Portugal, Calouste Gulbenkian Foundation, and the Galp Foundation.

References

1952 births
Living people
20th-century Portuguese painters
20th-century Portuguese women artists
People from Lisbon
Portuguese women painters
University of Lisbon alumni